Drew Fulk (born May 1, 1987), also known as WZRD BLD, is an American songwriter and record producer based in Los Angeles. He has worked with artists such as Disturbed, Lil Peep, Lil Wayne, Motionless in White, Kim Dracula, Highly Suspect and Illenium,  and has over ten #1 Billboard Rock to his name. He also started and currently runs his own publishing company, In the Cut Publishing, through APG.

Biography

Early years 
Fulk was born in Kernersville, North Carolina, where he attended Wesleyan Christian Academy in High Point. After high school he was accepted into the Bryan Business School at UNCG, majoring in Economics. During this time he built and opened his first recording studio, Think Sound. In North Carolina, Fulk worked with artists such as Motionless in White, Cane Hill, For All Those Sleeping, and Chris Lane. In late 2014, Fulk relocated to Los Angeles and started to work under the moniker "WZRD BLD" (pronounced "Wizard Blood")we he continued to work with artists such as Ice Nine Kills, Bullet for My Valentine, Fit for a King, Yelawolf, Moon Taxi, and I Prevail among others. In 2018, Fulk had his first No. 1 rock song with Pop Evil's lead single "Waking Lions".

2019–present 
In mid-2019, Fulk started his own publishing company, In the Cut Publishing, through BMG, aimed at signing rock-focused writers and producers and in late 2021 Fulk signed a new publishing for his own songwriting with Mike Caren's publishing company APG where In The Cut was eventually moved to as well. In October 2022, Fulk notched his tenth #1 Billboard US Mainstream Rock Radio song with Motionless in White's single "Masterpiece"  and has most recently been working with artists such as Disturbed, Highly Suspect, Kim Dracula, A Day to Remember, and Papa Roach.

Selected discography

References 

Living people
Record producers from North Carolina
1987 births
People from Kernersville, North Carolina